Miconia imitans is a species of plant in the family Melastomataceae. It is endemic to Ecuador.  Its natural habitat is subtropical or tropical moist montane forests.

References

imitans
Endemic flora of Ecuador
Vulnerable plants
Taxonomy articles created by Polbot